Tetraneuris turneri is a North American species of plants in the sunflower family, known by the common name Turner's four-nerve daisy. It has been found in the US state of Texas and in the nearby Mexican state of Coahuila.

It forms a branching underground caudex sometimes producing as many as 20 unbranched, above-ground stems, sometimes some of them leaning against other vegetation. The plant generally produces one flower head per stem. Each head has 12–24 yellow ray flowers surrounding 100–250 yellow disc flowers

References

External links
photo of herbarium specimen at Missouri Botanical Garden, collected in Texas in 1965

turneri
Flora of Coahuila
Flora of Texas
Plants described in 1970